Burtonulla is a genus of sponges belonging to the family Levinellidae.

The species of this genus are found in Indonesia.

Species:
 Burtonulla sibogae Borojevic & Boury-Esnault, 1986

References

Clathrinida
Sponge genera